High Hopes is a sitcom created by Boyd Clack, written by Clack and Kirsten Jones. Produced and directed by Gareth Gwenlan for BBC Wales, High Hopes is set in a fictional area of the South Wales Valleys called Cwm-Pen-Ôl (which is Welsh for 'Backside Valley'). It stars Margaret John as widow Elsie Hepplewhite, Robert Blythe as her son Richard Hepplewhite, Steven Meo as Hoffman and Oliver Wood (formerly Ben Evans) as Charlie. 
It revolves around Elsie's son Richard (known as Fagin) and his dodgy business ventures, assisted by the two boys, who attempted to rob the Hepplewhites' house in the first episode. 
The pilot was shown on BBC all over the UK in 1999, with slight differences to future cast and plot.

The sixth and final series, consisting of six episodes, was first shown on BBC1 Wales weekly from Tuesday, 11 November 2008. 
But, before it aired a BBC spokesman confirmed that "High Hopes" would not be recommissioned beyond 2009.
 
A three-part "Best Bits" special was shown on BBC1 Wales, starting 20 September; the third episode was on Sunday, 4 October 2009.

In December 2014 it was announced a one-off special  would be screened in March 2015 as a part of the BBC Wales 'Real Valleys' season of programmes.

Series Overview

Episodes

Series 1 (2002)

Series 2 (2003)

Series 3 (2004)

Series 4 (2005)

2006 Specials

Series 5 (2007)

Series 6 (2008)

2015 Special

References

External links 
 
 High Hopes on BBC
 
 

Lists of British sitcom episodes